Noah Dream On Final 2022 was a professional wrestling event promoted by CyberFight's sub-brand Pro Wrestling Noah. It took place on May 21, 2022, in Tokyo, Japan, at the Ota City General Gymnasium. The event aired on CyberAgent's AbemaTV online linear television service and CyberFight's streaming service Wrestle Universe.

Background

Storylines
The event featured ten professional wrestling matches that resulted from scripted storylines, where wrestlers portrayed villains, heroes, or less distinguishable characters in the scripted events that built tension and culminated in a wrestling match or series of matches.

Event
The night started with the confrontation between Kinya Okada and Kazuyuki Fujita solded with the victory of the latter. Next, Kai Fujimura and Yoshiki Inamura picked up a victory over Daiki Inaba and Junta Miyawaki. The third bout saw Shuhei Taniguchi defeating Mohammed Yone in singles action. The fourth match portraited Kongo (Hajime Ohara, Hi69 and Tadasuke) and Shuji Kondo overcoming the team of Momo No Seishun Tag (Atsushi Kotoge and Daisuke Harada), Hao and Yo-Hey. Next, Sugiura-gun (Hideki Suzuki and Takashi Sugiura) and Masaaki Mochizuki defeated Kongo (Katsuhiko Nakajima, Manabu Soya and Masakatsu Funaki). In the sixth match, Kenoh picked up a victory over Simon Gotch in singles action. The next bout portraited the internal stable clash between Chris Ridgeway and Yoshinari Ogawa, and Seiki Yoshioka and Yuya Susumu for the GHC Junior Heavyweight Tag Team Championship which ended in a no contest, therefore it was sanctioned as a successful defense for Ridgeway and Ogawa. Next, Hayata defeated Xtreme Tiger to retain the GHC Junior Heavyweight Championship for the first time in that reign. The semi main event saw Masa Kitamiya and Michael Elgin defeating Sugiura-gun International (El Hijo del Dr. Wagner Jr. and René Duprée) to capture the GHC Tag Team Championship.

In the main event, GHC Heavyweight Champion Go Shiozaki alongside Kaito Kiyomiya and Masato Tanaka succeeded in picking up a victory over the team of M's Alliance (Keiji Muto and Naomichi Marufuji) and Satoshi Kojima in six-man tag team action.

Results

References

External links
Pro Wrestling Noah official website

Pro Wrestling Noah
CyberAgent
2022 in professional wrestling
December 2022 events in Japan
Professional wrestling in Tokyo
Pro Wrestling Noah shows